NGC 2818 is a planetary nebula located in the southern constellation Pyxis (The Compass). It consists largely of glowing gases from the star's outer layers ejected during the final stages of its life when it had run out of the fuel necessary to sustain its core fusion processes. The remnants of its core will remain as a white dwarf.

It is often cited as a member of the open cluster NGC 2818A framing it, however, radial velocity differences between the planetary nebula and open cluster suggest a chance alignment.<ref
name=mermilliod2001>Mermilliod, J.-C., Clariá, J. J., Andersen, J., Piatti, A. E., Mayor, M. (2001).
Red giants in open clusters. IX. NGC 2324, 2818, 3960 and 6259, A&A</ref><ref
name=majaess2007>Majaess D. J., Turner D., Lane D. (2007). In Search of Possible Associations between Planetary Nebulae and Open Clusters, PASP, 119, 1349</ref> The case is an example of a superimposed pair, similar to NGC 2438 and M46.<ref
name=kiss2008>Kiss, L. L., Szabó, Gy. M., Balog, Z., Parker, Q. A., Frew, D. J. (2008). AAOmega radial velocities rule out current membership of the planetary nebula NGC 2438 in the open cluster M46, MNRAS</ref>

Partly because of their small total mass, open clusters have relatively poor gravitational cohesion. Consequently, open clusters tend to disperse after a relatively short time, typically some 10 million years, because of external gravitational influences amid other factors. Under exceptional conditions, open clusters can remain intact for up to 100 million years.

Theoretical models predict that planetary nebulae can form from main-sequence stars of between 8 and 1 solar masses, which puts their age at 40 million years and older. Although there are a few hundred known open clusters within that age range, a variety of reasons limit the chances of finding a member of an open cluster in a planetary nebula phase. One such reason is that the planetary nebula phase for more massive stars belonging to younger clusters is on the order of thousands of years - a blink of the eye in cosmic terms. Only one  association has been established between open clusters and nearby nebulae, the extremely distant nebula PHR 1315-6555.

References

External links

 

Planetary nebulae
2818
Pyxis (constellation)
372-PN13
Astronomical objects discovered in 1826